Cephalaria leucantha is a species of flowering plants in the family Caprifoliaceae.

Description
This hardy perennial plant has a long stem with divided, fern-like leaves. It produces white or pale lemon flowers from July to November.

Distribution
This species is present in northern Africa and in southern Europe (Albania, former Yugoslavia, Greece, Italy, France, Portugal, and Spain).

History
The species was described as Scabiosa trenta by Belsazar Hacquet in 1782. This resulted in a century-long search by other botanists to find the new species that Hacquet had described in the Julian Alps. It was not until 1893 that the Austrian botanist Anton Kerner von Marilaun determined that Hacquet's species was actually Cephalaria leucantha, which is now extinct in the Julian Alps.

References

 Tutin, T. G. et al., eds. 1964–1980. Flora europaea.

leucantha